Awe + Wonder is the second live album by Nashville-based contemporary worship band The Belonging Co. The album was released through their imprint label, TBCO Music, on September 13, 2019. The featured worship leaders on the album are Meredith Andrews, Cody Carnes, Hope Darst, Natalie Grant, Andrew Holt, Kari Jobe, Maggie Reed, Sarah Reeves, and Henry Seeley.

Awe + Wonder was supported by the release of "Isn't He (This Jesus)" as the lead and only single from the album. "Hosanna" was also released as a promotional single. The album debuted at No. 38 on the US Top Christian Albums chart.

Release and promotion

Singles
On March 23, 2018, The Belonging Co released "Isn't He (This Jesus)" featuring Natalie Grant, as the lead single from the album. The song debuted at number 27 on the US Hot Christian Songs chart.

Promotional singles
On September 9, 2019, The Belonging Co released "Hosanna" featuring Kari Jobe as the first promotional single from their second live album, Awe + Wonder, announced that the album was slated for release on September 13.

Critical reception
Jessica Morris of Others Magazine lauded the album in her review, describing the album as "an admirable follow-up, filled with a fresh and youthful energy," and concluding that is an "immaculate and well-crafted album, if you are looking for something new in worship, this is it."

Chart performance
In the United States, Awe + Wonder debuted at number 38 on the Billboard Top Christian Albums chart dated September 28, 2019.

Track listing

Charts

Release history

References

External links
 

2019 albums